Adayra Valley runs roughly from north to south, and divides the northern Saudi Arabian city of Ha'il into eastern and western halves. It starts as a branch of Rimmah Valley in the south, and drains into Qa'a Al-Milh in the town of Baq'a.

See also

 Shammar Mountains
 Salma Mountains
 Wadi
 Wildlife of Saudi Arabia

References

Valleys of Saudi Arabia
Saudi Arabia articles needing attention